Charlotte Salomon is an opera by Marc-André Dalbavie.  The libretto is by Barbara Honigmann (portions translated into French by Johannes Honigmann) who based much of it on Charlotte Salomon's autobiographical and posthumous work Leben? Oder Theater? The opera was first performed at the Salzburg Festival on July 28, 2014.

Composition  
The nature of Leben? Oder Theater? is of an artist fashioning her own life into an artistic creation.  Dalbavie said that the "intrinsically musical and even cinematic qualities of 'Leben? Oder Theater?'" combined with an attraction to real-life drama inspired him to compose an opera based on Charlotte Salomon.  Since Salomon was aiming for a form of communication that combined various arts, Dalbalvie felt that her story needed music. He was quoted as saying "She recreated her life through a work of art." Just as Dalbavie's opera Gesualdo (based on the life of Carlo Gesualdo) incorporates portions of his subject's compositions, so too does Dalbavie incorporate existing music into his opera, such as the "Habañera" from Bizet's Carmen and "Wir winden dir den Jungfernkranz" from Weber's Der Freischütz.

The opera includes a character representing the author Charlotte Salomon (speaking role), and also her fictive creation, named Charlotte Kann (mezzo-soprano).  While the opera (including the role of Charlotte Kann) is sung in French, the character named Charlotte Salomon comments on the action in German.  By the end of the opera, the languages are reversed, representing the integration of the artist her subject. 

Dalbavie's orchestrations derives from his analysis of the human voice's acoustic frequencies, a technique used in spectral music as well as alluding to a singing teacher's character in the opera.  Dalbavie described the scoring of the opera—for 65 orchestral musicians (the size of the Salzburg Mozarteum Orchestra)—as one designed not as much for dramatic impact as for "maximum tonal richness."

Premiere 
Charlotte Salomon is in two acts and an epilogue. It was first performed at the Salzburg Festival on July 28, 2014, where it was directed by Luc Bondy. The production involved twenty projections of Salomon's artwork.

Roles

References 

Compositions by Marc-André Dalbavie
Operas
Operas set in the 20th century
2014 operas
French-language operas
German-language operas
Operas based on real people
Operas set in France
Operas set in Germany
Cultural depictions of Charlotte Salomon